Samuel Kargbo (born 13 April 1974) is a former Gambian international footballer.

Career
Born in the Gambia, Kargbo played club football in the local league. He played for Steve Biko F.C., helping the club win its first Gambian Cup in 2000.

Kargbo made several appearances for the Gambia national football team, including the 1995 Amílcar Cabral Cup in Mauritania and 1998 FIFA World Cup qualifying rounds.

International goals
Scores and results list Gambia's goal tally first.

References

External links

1974 births
Living people
Gambian footballers
The Gambia international footballers

Association football midfielders